The Indian locomotive class WCAM-1 is a class of Bi-current (25 kV AC and 1.5 kV DC) electric locomotives that was developed in 1973 by Chittaranjan Locomotive Works for Indian Railways. The model name stands for broad gauge (W), DC Current (C), AC Current (A), Mixed traffic (M) locomotive,  1st generation (1). They entered service in March 1973. A total of 53 WCAM-1 were built at CLW between 1973 and 1979, which made them the most numerous class of mainline dual-power AC-DC  electric locomotive.

The WCAM-1 is one of the most successful locomotives of Indian Railways having served  both passenger and freight trains for over 42 years between 1973 and 2015. This class is a Bi-current version of the WAM-4 class. However, with the advent of new 3-phase locomotives like WAP-5 and WAP-7, the aging fleet of WCAM-1 locomotives were relegated to hauling smaller passenger trains and have been fully withdrawn from mainline duties. All units have been scrapped with no locomotives preserved.

History 
WCAM-1 was a class of locomotive used in the Indian Railways system. They were the first locomotives from the WCAM class. These locos were operational in routes around Mumbai. These locomotives worked on both AC as well as DC as their classification suggested. They hauled trains from DC section of suburban railway to AC section and thus performed a very critical task as they could easily operate on both AC and DC. However they performed poorly in DC mode compared to AC mode but they were very robust and had easy operating and handling characteristics. 
These were 1st class of Wide Gauge's (W) Bi-current charged (CA - runs both under AC and DC) and Mixed load series (M - hauls both passenger and freight trains). These were the first electric locomotives to enter Western Railway's Mumbai division; prior to that steam and diesel locomotives used to haul trains in Western Railway's Mumbai division. These brought an end to the steam era in this division. They were also the first locomotives allotted to Valsad (BL) shed. Their top speed under DC was the lowest, as compared to other Bi-current charged locomotives. They were the first Bi-current charged locomotives in the country. Initially all were vacuum braked but were retrofitted with air brakes to make them dual braked. Some also had their vacuum brakes replaced with air brakes. Introduced in 1975. One of the single pantographs on the WCAM-1 is used in dc traction; the other one carries ac current. The two pantographs were not identical, though similar in design. Originally built with vacuum brakes only, although a few (Nos. 21805, 21807, 21812, 21828, 21838, 21844, 21845, and 21850) had both vacuum and air brakes. They lacked dynamic brakes. The WCAM-1 did not use a variable ratio auto-transformer in AC mode like the others; it used a fixed-ratio transformer and rectifier bank to convert the OHE supply to 1500 V DC. The design of the transformers and notches made this a hard machine to operate, with the fusible links tending to blow often. Of the 28 notches, notches 4, 14, 21, and 28 were used for continuous operation, although notch 4 was intended for low-speed shunting and was very ineffective. Notches 14, 21, and 28 were the terminal notches of the series, series-parallel, and parallel circuit notch sequences. In DC mode, the WCAM-1 used resistor banks for speed control. However they were very robust machines and relatively easy in the handling characteristics. WCAM-1's had three traction modes (series, series-parallel, parallel) in both DC and AC mode, but using the parallel mode in DC was discouraged because of power problems. In practice this was not restrictive since series-parallel notches allowed reaching 75 km/h or so. In AC mode, the locos were almost always used with the motors in all-parallel mode. Unlike the WCAM-2 and WCAM-3 locos, no reconfiguration has been carried out to force the use of all-parallel mode with AC. Weak field operation was available. They were briefly tried out for freight use by CR, but all finally ended up with WR. The top ones getting the WCAM-2P (see below). [5/02] However, CR's Indore-Pune weekly train had been hauled by a WR WCAM-1. Max. speed 100 km/h, 110 km/h after regearing. Traction motors were nose-suspended and axle-hung.

Technical specifications

Of all the 30 notches, 1-21 were DC notches allowing series operation of traction motors. Rest of the 8 notches allow series-parallel combination under DC. Under AC, the combinations were 3S-2P and 2S-3P. These locomotives could run in parallel combination but it was discouraged due to power problems under DC. Under AC, the locomotives were run under parallel notches nearly always. Although these engines were not rebuilt to use only parallel combination under AC. Field weakening of traction motors was possible at 21st and 30th notches. Voltage control was done by Tap changer operation under AC and Resistance notching under DC. Traction motors were charged by DC. Its prototypes were tested in the year 1971.

Locomotive shed

All 54 WCAM-1 ever built were being held by Valsad Electric Loco Shed in Gujarat. All the locos of this class had been withdrawn from service after the conversion of entire Mumbai region into AC traction.

Trains Hauled by WCAM-1
All Superfast trains including Shatabdi and Rajdhani Exp (till Vadodara) until AC electrification of Mumbai area. Arrival of WCAM-2P engines did not reduce their work loads.
Later on with AC loco arrival and need for faster trains reduces these work horses duties to a few trains like
 Mumbai Central - Ahmedabad Junction Passenger
 Valsad - Bandra Terminus express
 Valsad - Viramgam Passenger
 Bharuch - Virar Passenger
 Valsad Fast Passenger
 Bandra Terminus Vapi Passenger
 Ahmedabad Passenger
 Surat - Virar Shuttle
 Ahmedabad - Valsad Passenger were hauled by these robust machines. WCAM-1 did its last run in 2015 before all being taken off duties and retired forever.

Performance 
Following is the capacity of WCAM-1 locomotive with gear ratio 16:61 under AC for 4 wheeler wagons (in tonnes) :-

Following is the capacity of WCAM-1 locomotive with a gear ratio of 16:61 under AC for BOX wagons (in tonnes) :-

Following is the capacity of WCAM-1 locomotive with gear ratio 16:61 under AC for ICF coaches (in tonnes) :-

Following is the capacity of WCAM-1 locomotive with a gear ratio of 16:61 under AC for BOXN wagons (in tonnes) :-

Following is the capacity of WCAM-1 locomotive with gear ratio 16:61 under DC for 4 wheeler wagons (in tonnes) :-

Following is the capacity of WCAM-1 locomotive fitted with TAO659A1 with a gear ratio of 16:61 under DC for BOX wagons (in tonnes) :-

Following is the capacity of WCAM-1 locomotive with gear ratio 16:61 under DC for ICF coaches (in tonnes) :-

Following is the capacity of WCAM-1 locomotive fitted with TAO659 with a gear ratio of 16:61 under DC for BOX wagons (in tonnes) :-

Following is the capacity of WCAM-1 locomotive with a gear ratio of 21:58 under AC for ICF coaches (in tonnes) :-

Following is the capacity of WCAM-1 locomotive with gear ratio 21:58 under DC for ICF coaches (in tonnes) :-

See also

Locomotives of India
Rail transport in India
Indian Railways

References

Notes

Bibliography

External links

 Details of WCAM-1 #21800 at IRFCA
 WCAM-1 specifications

1500 V DC locomotives
25 kV AC locomotives
Electric locomotives of India
5 ft 6 in gauge locomotives
Multi-system locomotives